is a Japanese footballer who plays as a forward and currently play for  club, Iwaki FC.

Youth career
Arita played for his high school between 2015 and 2017, before going on to play for Kokushikan University. In his second year, he was registered as a member of their squad to compete in Kanto Division 2 and made his first appearance as a substitute in a 3–1 win over Kanto Gakuin University. In his third year, Arita appeared four times for Kokushikan and he scored his first goal for the team in a 3–3 draw with Komazawa University, after only coming on as a substitute in the 85th minute. 
In his fourth and final year, Arita played a much bigger role for the university and scored 10 goals in 16 games in Kanto Division 1. This included a hattrick in a 2–3 victory over Hosei University. He also made his first appearances in the Japan Inter College Tournament, playing three games before being knocked out at the quarter-final stage.

Club career
In December 2021, it was announced that Arita would be signing for newly promoted J3 League team Iwaki FC for the 2022 season. He scored a last-minute winner on his debut in the third league game of the season – a 2–1 victory over Ehime FC. Arita continued to be used as a substitute throughout the first half of the season and had to wait until June for his first start. In spite of his limited game time, he managed to score 4 goals before the end of July. By August, he had forced his way into the starting line-up. Following three goals and an assist in four games helping Iwaki to an unbeaten month, Arita was awarded the J3 Monthly MVP award for August.

At the end of the 2022 season, Arita had helped Iwaki gain promotion to the J2 League for the first time in their history contributing with 17 goals in 31 matches. He finished the season as top scorer in the J3 League, with 9 goals coming in his last 8 games of the season. For his efforts, he was awarded the inaugural J3 MVP award for the 2022 season, inducted into the 2022 J3 Best XI and picked up his second Monthly MVP award for October/November. On 12 December 2022, Arita renewed his contract with the club for the upcoming 2023 season.

Career statistics

Club
.

Honours

Club
 Iwaki FC
J3 League : 2022

Individual
J3 Monthly MVP (2): August 2022, October/November 2022
J3 League Top Scorer: 2022
J3 MVP Award: 2022
J3 League Best XI: 2022

References

External links
Profile at Iwaki FC
Profile at J.League

1999 births
Living people
Japanese footballers
Association football forwards
Association football people from Fukuoka Prefecture
Kokushikan University alumni
Iwaki FC players
J3 League players
J3 League Player of the Year winners